Mammary Peak is a summit in Juneau City and Borough, Alaska, in the United States.

Its name is descriptive.

See also
Breast-shaped hill

References

Mountains of Juneau, Alaska
Mountains of Alaska